Ch'aki Qucha (Quechua ch'aki dry, qucha lake, "dry lake", also spelled Chaqui Khocha) is a  mountain in the Potosí mountain range in the Bolivian Andes at a lake of the same name. It is located in the Potosí Department, José María Linares Province, in the west of the Puna Municipality. Ch'aki Qucha lies south of the mountain Kuntur Ikiña, northeast of Kunturiri and a lake named T'ala Qucha and southeast of Jatun Kunturiri.

References 

Mountains of Potosí Department
Lakes of Potosí Department